The Shinjin-Ō (新人王, King of the New Stars) is a professional Go competition.

An annual Japanese tournament, it has been held continuously since 1976.

Format 
The Shinjin-Ō tournament is organised by the Japanese Nihon Ki-in. The tournament started in 1976 and is only open to players under 7-Dan and below 30 years of age. It is a single knockout tournament.

In 2006, the tournament was renamed the Shinjin-Ō U-25 (King of the New Stars U-25) and the age restriction was lowered to 25. The original thinking time was 4 hours but, along with the new age restriction, the time was shortened to 3 hours. The winner's purse is 3,280,000 Yen ($29,000).

Past winners

See also 

 List of professional Go tournaments

References

External links 
 Shinjin-Ō finals
 Nihon Ki-in archive of the Shinjin-Ō (in Japanese)

Go competitions in Japan